Thatchfield Great Cave is a large cave in Saint Ann Parish near the north coast of Jamaica. Because it is considered to be under threat its exact location is not widely publicised.

Natural history 
Thatchfield Great Cave is considered to be one of the largest bat roosts on the island of Jamaica. The cave also contains considerable numbers of invertebrates, in particular beetles and spiders. Most of the life in this cave is supported by large amounts of bat guano.

See also
 List of caves in Jamaica
Jamaican Caves Organisation
Saint Ann Parish, Jamaica

References

External links
Photos: Approach Entrance Lighthole and Great Gallery Great Gallery.
Thatchfield Great Cave - Jamaican Caves Organisation

Bat roosts
Caves of Jamaica
Geography of Saint Ann Parish
Caves of the Caribbean